Henry Cheyne may refer to:
Henry Cheyne, 1st Baron Cheyne
Henry le Chen or Cheyne, late 13th-century and early 14th-century Scoto-Norman bishop